Gavin Alexander Houston  (born December 10, 1977)  is an American actor, best known for playing the role of Jeffrey Harrington on the Oprah Winfrey Network primetime television soap opera, The Haves and the Have Nots from 2013 to 2021. He is also known for role as Remy Boudreau on the CBS daytime soap opera Guiding Light (2002-2006).

Life and career
Houston is the son of Lloyd and Colette Houston. He has an older sister named Tonza. Houston also has a daughter. After graduating from the University of Florida, Houston studied at the Manhattan Theatre Club. He began his career as a child actor appearing in commercials, and an episode of The Cosby Show. From 2002 to 2006, he was regular cast member on the CBS daytime soap opera Guiding Light playing the role of Remy Boudreau. He later had a recurring role on the ABC soap opera General Hospital, also guest-starred on Wizards of Waverly Place and Without a Trace.

In 2013, Houston began starring as Jeffrey Harrington on the Oprah Winfrey Network primetime television soap opera, The Haves and the Have Nots. The series ended in 2021 after 8 seasons. In 2016 he appeared in the Lifetime movie Toni Braxton: Unbreak My Heart playing Babyface, and in 2018 guest starred on Grey's Anatomy.

Filmography

Film

Television

References

External links
 
 

Living people
Male actors from New York City
American male soap opera actors
American male television actors
University of Florida alumni
21st-century American male actors
1977 births